Union of Islamic Iran People Party (Hezb-e Ettehad-e Mellat-e Iran-e Eslami) is an Iranian reformist political party founded in 2015.

Establishment 
In January 2015, it was confirmed by the Ministry of Interior that it has received a request for a permit to establish a new political party. The reformists carried out some six similar initiatives for party formation in the past six months.
It was officially given permission on April 20, 2015.

Members 
Most members of the party are former members of Islamic Iran Participation Front, banned in 2009. The party was accused of being a "front" for the banned Islamic Iran Participation Front, which was tacticly denied by the party.

Central council of the party consists of 30 members, including Gholamreza Ansari, Hamidreza Jalaeipour, Fatemeh Rakeei and Jalal Jalalizadeh. Emadaddin Khatami, son of Mohammad Khatami is also a member.

Party leaders

Current officeholders 

Parliament
 Farid Mousavi (Tehran, Rey, Shemiranat and Eslamshahr)
City Council of Tehran
 Zahra Sadr-Azam Nouri
 Elham Fakhari
 Ali E'ta
 Arash Hosseini Milani
 Mahmoud Mirlohi

Elections 
The party which intended to take part in the 2016 Iranian legislative election, was part of List of Hope.

Notes & References 

Reformist political groups in Iran
Political parties established in 2015
2015 establishments in Iran